Shelagh Wakely (22 October 1932 – 19 March 2011) was a British sculptor and experimental artist.

Wakely was born in Madingley, Cambridgeshire in 1932. She studied painting and screen-printing at the Chelsea College of Art in the late 1950s. She also studied  at the Royal College of Art. She began her career as a textile designer.

Her work is included in the collections of the Tate Museum and the British Council.

References

1932 births
2011 deaths
20th-century English women artists
21st-century English women artists
English women sculptors